Sarv-e Nav may refer to:
 Sarv-e Nav-e Olya
 Sarv-e Nav-e Sofla